94 Aquarii (abbreviated 94 Aqr) is a triple star system in the equatorial constellation of Aquarius. 94 Aquarii is the Flamsteed designation. The brightest member has an apparent visual magnitude of 5.19, making it visible to the naked eye.

The inner pair of this triple star system form a spectroscopic binary with an orbital period of 6.321 years, a moderate orbital eccentricity of 0.173, and a combined visual magnitude of 5.19. The primary component of this pair has a stellar classification of G8.5 IV, with the luminosity class of IV indicating this is a subgiant star. At an angular separation of 13.0 arcseconds from this pair is a magnitude 7.52 K-type main sequence star with a classification of K2 V.

References

External links
 Image 94 Aquarii

Aquarius (constellation)
Spectroscopic binaries
Aquarii, 094
G-type subgiants
K-type main-sequence stars
8866
115126
Durchmusterung objects
219834
Triple star systems
0894.2